Chamalières is a commune in the Puy-de-Dôme department, Auvergne-Rhône-Alpes, central France.

With 17,276 inhabitants (2019), Chamalières is the fourth-largest town in the department.

History
Several thousand wooden Gallo-Roman ex-votos, most of them anthropomorphic standing figures, also including images of limbs and internal organs, dated by associated coins to the first century, were recovered from the shrine at the  mineral springs known as the Source des Roches ("Rock Spring"). An inscribed lead tablet found at the spring is a major source of information on the Gaulish language. A comparable cache of Gaulish ex-voto were recovered from a sanctuary at the sources of the Seine, sacred to Sequana.

Population

Notable places
Chamalières is the place where the Banque de France located its printing works in 1923, which printed former French franc banknotes, and now prints Euro and West African CFA franc banknotes.

People
 Raoul Lufbery (1885–1918), French-American fighter pilot and flying ace in World War I.
 Pierre Schoendoerffer (1928–2012), French film director.
 Valéry Giscard d'Estaing (1926-2020), former President of the French Republic (1974-1981), former mayor of Chamalières (1967-1974).
 Claude Giraud (born 1936), French stage and film actor; voice over actor for Robert Redford, Tommy Lee Jones, Alain Rickman.
 Renaud Camus (born 1946), French author and essayist.
Daniel Vernet (c. 1945-2018), former editor-in-chief of Le Monde.

See also
Communes of the Puy-de-Dôme department

References

Further reading

External links

 Official website 
 ex-votos from the Source des Roches on display at the Musée Bargoin, Clermont-Ferrand.

Communes of Puy-de-Dôme
Auvergne